The California Fall League was a professional baseball league located in California that was affiliated with Major League Baseball. The league lasted one season, playing from September to November, 1999.

History 
The California Fall League was the third in a series of attempts by Major League Baseball to establish a second winter league to supplement the Arizona Fall League. In this the California Fall League was preceded by Hawaii Winter Baseball (1994-1997) and Maryland Fall Baseball (1998) and succeeded by Hawaii Winter Baseball (2006-2008). The league played a 42-game schedule between September 23 and November 5 with games Tuesday through Sunday. It averaged below 500 fans per game, fewer than Maryland Fall Baseball had.

Teams 

The Lancaster Stealth were the league champions.

See also 
 Hawaii Winter Baseball
 Maryland Fall Baseball

References 

Baseball leagues in California
Defunct minor baseball leagues in the United States
Winter baseball leagues
Sports leagues established in 1999
Sports leagues disestablished in 1999
1999 establishments in California
1999 disestablishments in California
1999 in sports in California